Joseph Melville Barnett (3 November 1920 – May 1999), was a Welsh born male weightlifter who competed for England and Wales.

Weightlifting career
He competed in the Weightlifting at the 1952 Summer Olympics.

He represented England in the -90 kg Combined division at the 1954 British Empire and Commonwealth Games in Vancouver, Canada.

Four years later he represented Wales in the -90 kg Combined division at the 1958 British Empire and Commonwealth Games in Cardiff, Wales.

References

1920 births
1999 deaths
English male weightlifters
Welsh male weightlifters
Commonwealth Games medallists in weightlifting
Commonwealth Games bronze medallists for England
Olympic weightlifters of Great Britain
Weightlifters at the 1952 Summer Olympics
Weightlifters at the 1954 British Empire and Commonwealth Games
Medallists at the 1954 British Empire and Commonwealth Games